Kojima-1Lb (TCP J05074264+2447555) is an exoplanet discovered trough the microlensing method. The host star lens was discovered by the amateur astronomer Tadashi Kojima (小嶋正). As of November 2019 it is the planet around the brightest microlensing host star and consequently around a nearby star, as opposed to most of the microlensing planets, which are usually found around distant and inaccessible host stars.

Naming 
The microlensing event was first reported on CBAT as TCP J05074264+2447555 by Kojima. Conventionally microlensing planets are named after the discoverer of the microlensing event and not after the discoverer of the planetary feature. The discovery group of the planetary feature nicknamed the microlensing event Feynman-01 in honour of the Osservatorio Astroficico R.P. Feynman that discovered the planetary feature. The star now appears as Kojima-1 in SIMBAD.

Discovery 
The microlensing event caused by the star Kojima-1L moving in front of a background star was first observed by Tadashi Kojima from Gunma prefecture in Japan with a Canon EOS 6D + 135-mm f3.2 lens on the 02. and 25. October 2017. ASASSN confirmed it as a microlensing event, but described it as a single-lens event. Nucita et al. 2017 used the photometry by AAVSO and the R.P. Feynman Observatory to first establish that TCP J05074264+2447555 was a binary lens with a hint to a new planetary system. Nucita et al. 2018 finally announced the discovery of the planet.

Lensed background star 
The lensed background star is about 800 parsec distant from earth.

Lensing system

The star 
It is the brightest microlensing host star with Ks=13.7 mag.

The planet 
The planet has a mass of about 20 earth masses and has a projected separation of 0.8 or 0.9 astronomical units from its host star. This translates into a semi-major axis of about 1.1 astronomical units, which was inside and near the ice line at the younger age of the system.

The planet might have first formed while the snow line was at a distance larger than the orbit of the planet. As the snow line decreased, it might have crossed the orbit of the planet at around 2.2 Myrs after the Kojima-1L system has formed. Circumstellar disks around low-mass stars have lifetime of a few 10 Myrs. During planet-formation, the planet might have experienced a period of a gas-rich, but ice-poor environment, before it got more ice-rich in a following period. It is difficult to form planets as massive such as Kojima-1Lb if the ice-rich period was during a gas-poor period. It is more likely that some gas remained in the ice-rich period. This way Kojima-1Lb could have grown fast during the ice-rich period, by accreting solid material and then accreting the remaining gas.

Future observations 
In the future it might be possible to observe the star causing the lens. With current Adaptive Optics instruments it is predicted that the background star and the star causing the lens can be resolved in 2021. This will enable an independent characterization of the host star by taking a spectrum. VLT/Espresso might even be able to detect the 1.3 year orbital period planet Kojima-1Lb with the radial velocity method. A follow-up with for example Subaru/IRD might even be able to detect additional inner and/or massive planets around Kojima-1L

References

External Links 

 Discovery image by T. Kojima
 Article about Kojima-1Lb by Sky & Telescope
 Osservatorio Astrofisico R.P.Feynman

Taurus (constellation)
Exoplanets detected by microlensing
Giant planets
Exoplanets discovered in 2018